P U Shanmugam, affectionately called as Paa Vuu Saa (15 August 1924 - 11 April 2007) was an Indian politician and former minister of Tamil Nadu for Internal affairs, former minister of Public works, former minister of public health and various other portfolios on various tenures. The Dravidian veteran also worked as the Organisation Secretary of DMK and the 3rd General Secretary of AIADMK. He defeated the Indian National Congress candidate in Tiruvannamalai Assembly constituency by-election in 1963 on DMK ticket.

Early life 
P U Shanmugam was born in a Tuluva Vellala Mudaliar family of Tiruvannamalai in 1924. He was SSLC educated at Municipal High School in Tiruvannamalai.

Legislative victories
He was elected to the Tamil Nadu legislative assembly from Tiruvannamalai constituency as an Independent candidate in 1957 election, as a Dravida Munnetra Kazhagam candidate in 1971, and 1977 elections. He lost to Congress candidate in 1980 election from Tiruvannamalai constituency as an All India Anna Dravida Munnetra Kazhagam Candidate. He was elected to the Tamil Nadu legislative assembly respresenting All India Anna Dravida Munnetra Kazhagam in 1984 election. He also contested from Melmalayanur constituency and lost  in 1989 election as a candidate of All India Anna Dravida Munnetra Kazhagam (AIADMK) Janaki faction. In 1989, He joined DMK and served as the Convenor of DMK Party High Level Working Committee till his death in 2007.

References 

Madras MLAs 1957–1962
Madras MLAs 1962–1967
Tamil Nadu MLAs 1971–1976
Tamil Nadu MLAs 1977–1980
1924 births
2007 deaths
Tamil Nadu MLAs 1985–1989
Dravida Munnetra Kazhagam politicians
All India Anna Dravida Munnetra Kazhagam politicians